A kiss is the touch or pressing of one's lips against another person or an object. Cultural connotations of kissing vary widely. Depending on the culture and context, a kiss can express sentiments of love, passion, romance, sexual attraction, sexual activity, sexual arousal, affection, respect, greeting, peace, and good luck, among many others. In some situations, a kiss is a ritual, formal or symbolic gesture indicating devotion, respect, or a sacramental.

History 
Anthropologists disagree on whether kissing is an instinctual or learned behaviour. Those that believe kissing to be an instinctual behaviour, cite similar behaviours in other animals such as bonobos, which are known to kiss after fighting - possibly to restore peace. Others believe that it is a learned behaviour, having evolved from activities such as suckling or premastication in early human cultures passed on to modern humans. Another theory posits that the practice originated in males during the paleolithic era tasting the saliva of females to test their health in order to determine whether they would make a good partner for procreation. The fact that not all human cultures kiss is used as an argument against kissing being an instinctual behaviour in humans; only around 90% of the human population is believed to practice kissing.

The earliest reference to kissing-like behavior comes from the Vedas, Sanskrit scriptures that informed Hinduism, around 3,500 years ago, according to Vaughn Bryant, an anthropologist at Texas A&M University who specializes in the history of the kiss.

Both lip and tongue kissing are mentioned in Sumerian poetry:

Kissing is described in the surviving ancient Egyptian love poetry from the New Kingdom, found on papyri excavated at Deir el-Medina:

 features the first man-woman kiss in the Bible, when Jacob flees from Esau and goes to the house of his uncle Laban:

Much later, there is the oft-quoted verse from :

In Cyropaedia (370 BC), Xenophon wrote about the Persian custom of kissing in the lips upon departure while narrating the departure of Cyrus the Great (c. 600 BC) as a boy from his Median kinsmen. According to Herodotus (5th century BC), when two Persians meet, the greeting formula expresses their equal or inequal status. They do not speak; rather, equals kiss each other on the mouth, and in the case where one is a little inferior to the other, the kiss is given on the cheek.

During the later Classical period, affectionate mouth-to-mouth kissing was first described in the Hindu epic the Mahabharata.

Anthropologist Vaughn Bryant argues kissing spread from India to Europe after Alexander the Great conquered parts of Punjab in northern India in 326 BCE.

The Romans were passionate about kissing and talked about several types of kissing.

Kissing was not always an indication of eros, or love, but also could show respect and rank as it was used in Medieval Europe.

The study of kissing started sometime in the nineteenth century and is called philematology, which has been studied by people including Cesare Lombroso, Ernest Crawley, Charles Darwin, Edward Burnett Tylor and modern scholars such as Elaine Hatfield.

Types 
Kristoffer Nyrop identified a number of types of kisses, including kisses of love, affection, peace, respect, and friendship. He notes, however, that the categories are somewhat contrived and overlapping, and some cultures have more kinds, including the French with twenty and the Germans with thirty.

Expression of affection 
Kissing another person's lips has become a common expression of affection or warm greeting in many cultures worldwide. Yet in certain cultures, kissing was introduced only through European settlement, before which it was not a routine occurrence. Such cultures include certain indigenous peoples of Australia, the Tahitians, and many tribes in Africa.

A kiss can also be used to express feelings without an erotic element but can be nonetheless "far deeper and more lasting", writes Nyrop. He adds that such kisses can be expressive of love "in the widest and most comprehensive meaning of the word, bringing a message of loyal affection, gratitude, compassion, sympathy, intense joy, and profound sorrow."

Nyrop writes that the most common example is the "intense feeling which knits parents to their offspring", but he adds that kisses of affection are not only common between parents and children, but also between other members of the same family, which can include those outside the immediate family circle, "everywhere where deep affection unites people." The tradition is written of in the Bible, as when Esau met Jacob after a long separation, he ran towards him, fell on his neck, and kissed him, Moses greeted his father-in-law and kissed him, and Orpah kissed her mother-in-law before leaving her. The family kiss was traditional with the Romans and kisses of affection are often mentioned by the early Greeks, as when Odysseus, on reaching his home, meets his faithful shepherds.

Affection can be a cause of kissing "in all ages in grave and solemn moments," notes Nyrop, "not only among those who love each other, but also as an expression of profound gratitude. When the Apostle Paul took leave of the elders of the congregation at Ephesus, "they all wept sore, and fell on Paul's neck and kissed him" (Acts 20:37)." Kisses can also be exchanged between total strangers, as when there is a profound sympathy with or the warmest interest in another person.

Folk poetry has been the source of affectionate kisses where they sometimes played an important part, as when they had the power to cast off spells or to break bonds of witchcraft and sorcery, often restoring a man to his original shape. Nyrop notes the poetical stories of the "redeeming power of the kiss are to be found in the literature of many countries, especially, for example, in the Old French Arthurian romances (Lancelot, Guiglain, Tirant le blanc) in which the princess is changed by evil arts into a dreadful dragon, and can only resume her human shape in the case of a knight being brave enough to kiss her." In the reverse situation, in the tale of "Beauty and the Beast", a transformed prince then told the girl that he had been bewitched by a wicked fairy, and could not be recreated into a man unless a maid fell in love with him and kissed him, despite his ugliness.

A kiss of affection can also take place after death. In , it is written that when Jacob was dead, "Joseph fell upon his father's face and wept upon him and kissed him." And it is told of Abu Bakr, Muhammad's first disciple, father-in-law, and successor, that, when the prophet was dead, he went into the latter's tent, uncovered his face, and kissed him. Nyrop writes that "the kiss is the last tender proof of love bestowed on one we have loved, and was believed, in ancient times, to follow mankind to the nether world."

Kissing on the lips can be a physical expression of affection or love between two people in which the sensations of touch, taste, and smell are involved. According to the psychologist Menachem Brayer, although many "mammals, birds, and insects exchange caresses" which appear to be kisses of affection, they are not kisses in the human sense.

Surveys indicate that kissing is the second most common form of physical intimacy among United States adolescents (after holding hands), and that about 85% of 15 to 16-year-old adolescents in the US have experienced it.

Kiss on the lips 
The kiss on the lips can be performed between two friends or family. This move aims to express affection for a friend. Unlike kissing for love, a friendly kiss has no sexual connotation. The kiss on the lips is a practice that can be found in the time of Patriarchs (Bible). In Ancient Greece, the kiss on the mouth was used to express a concept of equality between people of the same rank. In the Middle Ages, the kiss of peace was recommended by the Catholic Church. The kiss on the lips was also common among knights. The gesture has again become popular with young people, particularly in England.

Romantic kiss 

In many cultures, it is considered a harmless custom for teenagers to kiss on a date or to engage in kissing games with friends. These games serve as icebreakers at parties and may be some participants' first exposure to sexuality. There are many such games, including Truth or Dare?, Seven Minutes in Heaven (or the variation "Two Minutes in the Closet"), Spin the Bottle, Post Office, and Wink.

The psychologist William Cane notes that kissing in Western society is often a romantic act and describes a few of its attributes:
Romantic kissing in Western cultures is a fairly recent development and is rarely mentioned even in ancient Greek literature. In the Middle Ages it became a social gesture and was considered a sign of refinement of the upper classes. Other cultures have different definitions and uses of kissing, notes Brayer. In China, for example, a similar expression of affection consists of rubbing one's nose against the cheek of another person. In other Eastern cultures kissing is not common. In South East Asian countries the "sniff kiss" is the most common form of affection and Western mouth to mouth kissing is often reserved for sexual foreplay. In some tribal cultures the "equivalent to 'kiss me' is 'smell me.'"

The kiss can be an important expression of love and erotic emotions. In his book The Kiss and its History, Kristoffer Nyrop describes the kiss of love as an "exultant message of the longing of love, love eternally young, the burning prayer of hot desire, which is born on the lovers' lips, and 'rises,' as Charles Fuster has said, 'up to the blue sky from the green plains,' like a tender, trembling thank-offering." Nyrop adds that the love kiss, "rich in promise, bestows an intoxicating feeling of infinite happiness, courage, and youth, and therefore surpasses all other earthly joys in sublimity." He also compares it to achievements in life: "Thus even the highest work of art, yet, the loftiest reputation, is nothing in comparison with the passionate kiss of a woman one loves."

The power of a kiss is not minimized when he writes that "we all yearn for kisses and we all seek them; it is idle to struggle against this passion. No one can evade the omnipotence of the kiss ..." Kissing, he implies, can lead one to maturity: "It is through kisses that a knowledge of life and happiness first comes to us. Runeberg says that the angels rejoice over the first kiss exchanged by lovers," and can keep one feeling young: "It carries life with it; it even bestows the gift of eternal youth." The importance of the lover's kiss can also be significant, he notes: "In the case of lovers a kiss is everything; that is the reason why a man stakes his all for a kiss," and "man craves for it as his noblest reward."

As a result, kissing as an expression of love is contained in much of literature, old and new. Nyrop gives a vivid example in the classic love story of Daphnis and Chloe. As a reward "Chloe has bestowed a kiss on Daphnis—an innocent young-maid's kiss, but it has on him the effect of an electrical shock":

Romantic kissing "requires more than simple proximity," notes Cane. It also needs "some degree of intimacy or privacy, ... which is why you'll see lovers stepping to the side of a busy street or sidewalk." Psychologist Wilhelm Reich "lashed out at society" for not giving young lovers enough privacy and making it difficult to be alone. However, Cane describes how many lovers manage to attain romantic privacy despite being in a public setting, as they "lock their minds together" and thereby create an invisible sense of "psychological privacy." He adds, "In this way they can kiss in public even in a crowded plaza and keep it romantic." Nonetheless, when Cane asked people to describe the most romantic places they ever kissed, "their answers almost always referred to this ends-of-the-earth isolation, ... they mentioned an apple orchard, a beach, out in a field looking at the stars, or at a pond in a secluded area ..."

Kiss as ritual 

Throughout history, a kiss has been a ritual, formal, symbolic or social gesture indicating devotion, respect or greeting. It appears as a ritual or symbol of religious devotion. For example, in the case of kissing a temple floor, or a religious book or icon. Besides devotion, a kiss has also indicated subordination or, nowadays, respect.

In modern times the practice continues, as in the case of a bride and groom kissing at the conclusion of a wedding ceremony or national leaders kissing each other in greeting, and in many other situations.

Religion 
A kiss in a religious context is common. In earlier periods of Christianity or Islam, kissing became a ritual gesture, and is still treated as such in certain customs, as when "kissing... relics, or a bishop's ring." In Judaism, the kissing of the Torah scroll, a prayer book, and a prayer shawl is also common. Crawley notes that it was "very significant of the affectionate element in religion" to give so important a part to the kiss as part of its ritual. In the early Church the baptized were kissed by the celebrant after the ceremony, and its use was even extended as a salute to saints and religious heroes, with Crawley adding, "Thus Joseph kissed Jacob, and his disciples kissed Paul. Joseph kissed his dead father, and the custom was retained in our civilization", as the farewell kiss on dead relatives, although certain sects prohibit this today.

A distinctive element in the Christian liturgy was noted by Justin in the 2nd century, now referred to as the "kiss of peace," and once part of the rite in the primitive Mass. Conybeare has stated that this act originated within the ancient Hebrew synagogue, and Philo, the ancient Jewish philosopher called it a "kiss of harmony", where, as Crawley explains, "the Word of God brings hostile things together in concord and the kiss of love." Saint Cyril also writes, "this kiss is the sign that our souls are united, and that we banish all remembrance of injury."

Kiss of peace 
Nyrop notes that the kiss of peace was used as an expression of deep, spiritual devotion in the early Christian Church. Christ said, for instance, "Peace be with you, my peace I give you," and the members of Christ's Church gave each other peace symbolically through a kiss. St Paul repeatedly speaks of the "holy kiss," and, in his Epistle to the Romans, writes: "Salute one another with an holy kiss" and his first Epistle to the Thessalonians (1 Thessalonians 5:26), he says: "Greet all the brethren with an holy kiss."

The kiss of peace was also used in secular festivities. During the Middle Ages, for example, Nyrop points out that it was the custom to "seal the reconciliation and pacification of enemies by a kiss." Even knights gave each other the kiss of peace before proceeding to the combat, and forgave one another all real or imaginary wrongs. The holy kiss was also found in the ritual of the Church on solemn occasions, such as baptism, marriage, confession, ordination, or obsequies. However, toward the end of the Middle Ages the kiss of peace disappears as the official token of reconciliation.

Kiss of respect 

The kiss of respect is of ancient origin, notes Nyrop. He writes that "from the remotest times we find it applied to all that is holy, noble, and worshipful—to the gods, their statues, temples, and altars, as well as to kings and emperors; out of reverence, people even kissed the ground, and both sun and moon were greeted with kisses."

He notes some examples, as "when the prophet Hosea laments over the idolatry of the children of Israel, he says that they make molten images of calves and kiss them". In classical times similar homage was often paid to the gods, and people were known to kiss the hands, knees, feet, and the mouths, of their idols. Cicero writes that the lips and beard of the famous statue of Hercules at Agrigentum were worn away by the kisses of devotees.

People kissed the cross with the image of Jesus, and such kissing of the cross is always considered a holy act. In many countries it is required, on taking an oath, as the highest assertion that the witness would be speaking the truth. Nyrop notes that "as a last act of charity, the image of the Redeemer is handed to the dying or death-condemned to be kissed." Kissing the cross brings blessing and happiness; people kiss the image of Mary and the pictures and statues of saints—not only their pictures, "but even their relics are kissed," notes Nyrop. "They make both soul and body whole." There are legends innumerable of sick people regaining their health by kissing relics, he points out.

The kiss of respect has also represented a mark of fealty, humility and reverence. Its use in ancient times was widespread, and Nyrop gives examples: "people threw themselves down on the ground before their rulers, kissed their footprints, literally 'licked the dust,' as it is termed." "Nearly everywhere, wheresoever an inferior meets a superior, we observe the kiss of respect. The Roman slaves kissed the hands of their masters; pupils and soldiers those of their teachers and captains respectively." People also kissed the earth for joy on returning to their native land after a lengthened absence, as when Agamemnon returned from the Trojan War.

Kiss of friendship 
The kiss is also commonly used in American and European culture as a salutation between friends or acquaintances. The friendly kiss until recent times usually occurred only between ladies, but today it is also common between men and women, especially if there is a great difference in age. According to Nyrop, up until the 20th century, "it seldom or never takes place between men, with the exception, however, of royal personages," although he notes that in former times the "friendly kiss was very common with us between man and man as well as between persons of opposite sexes." In guilds, for example, it was customary for the members to greet each other "with hearty handshakes and smacking kisses," and, on the conclusion of a meal, people thanked and kissed both their hosts and hostesses.

Cultural significance 
In approximately 10% of the world population, kissing does not take place, for a variety of reasons, including that they find it dirty or because of superstitious reasons. For example, in parts of Sudan it is believed that the mouth is the portal to the soul, so they do not want to invite death or have their spirit taken. Psychology professor Elaine Hatfield noted that "kissing was far from universal and even seen as improper by many societies." Despite kissing being widespread, in some parts of the world it is still taboo to kiss publicly and is often banned in films or in other media.

As a theme in art

South Asia 
On-screen lip-kissing was not a regular occurrence in Bollywood until the 1990s, although it has been present from the time of the inception of Bollywood. This can appear contradictory since the culture of kissing is believed to have originated and spread from India.

Middle East 
There are also taboos as to whom one can kiss in some Muslim-majority societies governed by religious law. In the Islamic Republic of Iran, a man who kisses or touches a woman who is not his wife or relative can be punished such as getting whipped up to 100 times or even go to jail.

East Asia 
Donald Richie comments that in Japan, as in China, although kissing took place in erotic situations, in public "the kiss was invisible", and the "touching of the lips never became the culturally encoded action it has for so long been in Europe and America." The early Edison film, The Widow Jones – the May Irwin-John Rice Kiss (1896), created a sensation when it was shown in Tokyo, and people crowded to view the enormity. Likewise, Rodin's sculpture The Kiss was not displayed in Japan until after the Pacific War. Also, in the 1900s, Manchu tribes along the Amur River regarded public kissing between adults with revulsion. In a similar situation in Chinese tradition, when Chinese men saw Western women kissing men in public, they thought the women were prostitutes.

Contemporary practices 

In modern Western culture, kissing on the lips is commonly an expression of affection or a warm greeting. When lips are pressed together for an extended period, usually accompanied with an embrace, it is an expression of romantic and sexual desire. The practice of kissing with an open mouth, to allow the other to suck their lips or move their tongue into their mouth, is called French kissing. "Making out" is often an adolescent's first experience of their sexuality and games which involve kissing, such as Spin the Bottle, facilitate the experience. People may kiss children on the forehead to comfort them or the cheek or lips to show affection.

In modern Eastern culture, the etiquette vary depending on the region. In West Asia, kissing on the lips between both men and women is a common form of greeting. In South and Eastern Asia, it might often be a greeting between women, however, between men, it is unusual. Kissing a baby on the cheeks is a common form of affection. Most kisses between men and women are on the cheeks and not on the lips unless they are romantically involved. And sexual forms of kissing between lovers encompass the whole range of global practices.

Kissing in films 
The first romantic kiss on screen was in American silent films in 1896, beginning with the film The Kiss. The kiss lasted 18 seconds and caused many to rail against decadence in the new medium of silent film. Writer Louis Black writes that "it was the United States that brought kissing out of the Dark Ages." However, it met with severe disapproval by defenders of public morality, especially in New York. One critic proclaimed that "it is absolutely disgusting. Such things call for police interference."

Young moviegoers began emulating romantic stars on the screen, such as Ronald Colman and Rudolph Valentino, the latter known for ending his passionate scenes with a kiss. Valentino also began his romantic scenes with women by kissing her hand, traveling up her arm, and then kissing her on the back of her neck. Actresses were often turned into stars based on their screen portrayals of passion. Actresses like Nazimova, Pola Negri, Vilma Bánky and Greta Garbo, became screen idols as a result.

Eventually, the film industry began to adopt the dictates of the Production Code established in 1934, overseen by Will Hays and influenced by Christian religious leaders in America.   According to the new code, "Excessive and lustful kissing, lustful embraces, suggestive postures and gestures, are not to be shown." As a result, kissing scenes were shortened, with scenes cut away, leaving the imagination of the viewer to take over. Under the code, actors kissing had to keep their feet on the ground and had to be either standing or sitting.

The heyday of romantic kissing on the screen took place in the early sound era, during the Golden Age of Hollywood in the 1930s and 1940s. Body language began to be used to supplement romantic scenes, especially with the eyes, a talent that added to Greta Garbo's fame. Author Lana Citron writes that "men were perceived as the kissers and women the receivers. Should the roles ever be reversed, women were regarded as vamps . . ." According to Citron, Mae West and Anna May Wong were the only Hollywood actresses never to have been kissed on screen. Among the films rated for having the most romantic kisses are Gone with the Wind, From Here to Eternity, Casablanca, and To Have and Have Not.

Sociologist Eva Illouz notes that surveys taken in 1935 showed that "love was the most important theme represented in movies. Similar surveys during the 1930s found the 95% of films had romance as one of their plot lines, what film critics called "the romantic formula."

In early Japanese films, kissing and sexual expression were controversial. In 1931, a director slipped a kissing scene past the censor (who was a friend), but when the film opened in a downtown Tokyo theater, the screening was stopped and the film confiscated. During the American occupation of Japan, in 1946, an American censor required a film to include a kissing scene. One scholar says that the censor suggested "we believe that even Japanese do something like kissing when they love each other. Why don't you include that in your films?" Americans encouraged such scenes to force the Japanese to express publicly actions and feelings that had been considered strictly private. Since Pearl Harbor, Americans had felt that the Japanese were "sneaky", claiming that "if Japanese kissed in private, they should do it in public too."

Non-sexual kisses 

In some Western cultures it is considered good luck to kiss someone on Christmas or on New Year's Eve, especially beneath a sprig of mistletoe. Newlyweds usually kiss at the end of a wedding ceremony.

Female friends and relations and close acquaintances commonly offer reciprocal kisses on the cheek as a greeting or farewell.
Where cheek kissing is used, in some countries a single kiss is the custom, while in others a kiss on each cheek is the norm, or even three or four kisses on alternating cheeks. In the United States, an air kiss is becoming more common. This involves kissing in the air near the cheek, with the cheeks touching or not. After a first date, it is common for the couple to give each other a quick kiss on the cheek (or lips where that is the norm) on parting, to indicate that a good time was had and perhaps to indicate an interest in another meeting.

A symbolic kiss is frequent in Western cultures. A kiss can be "blown" to another by kissing the fingertips and then blowing the fingertips, pointing them in the direction of the recipient. This is used to convey affection, usually when parting or when the partners are physically distant but can view each other. Blown kisses are also used when a person wishes to convey affection to a large crowd or audience. The term flying kiss is used in India to describe a blown kiss. In written correspondence a kiss has been represented by the letter "X" since at least 1763. A stage or screen kiss may be performed by actually kissing, or faked by using the thumbs as a barrier for the lips and turning so the audience is unable to fully see the act.

Some literature suggests that a significant percentage of humanity does not kiss. It has been claimed that in Sub-Saharan African, Asiatic, Polynesian and possibly in some Native American cultures, kissing was relatively unimportant until European colonization. Historically however, the culture of kissing is thought to have begun and spread from the Eastern World, specifically India.

With the Andamanese, kissing was only used as a sign of affection towards children and had no sexual undertones.

In traditional Islamic cultures, kissing is not permitted between a man and woman who are not married or closely related by blood or marriage. A kiss on the cheek is a very common form of greeting among members of the same sex in most Islamic countries, much like the Southern European pattern.

Legality of public kissing 

In 2007, two people were fined and jailed for a month after kissing and hugging in public in Dubai.

In India, public display of affection is a criminal offense under Section 294 of the Indian Penal Code, 1860 with a punishment of imprisonment of up to three months, or a fine, or both. This law was used by police and lower courts to harass and prosecute couples engaging in intimate acts, such as kissing in public. However, in a number of landmark cases, the higher courts dismissed assertions that kissing in public is obscene.

In religion 

The kiss is used in numerous other contexts in the Bible: the kiss of homage, in Esther 5:2; of subjection, in 1 Samuel 10:1; of reconciliation, in 2 Samuel 14:33; of valediction, in Ruth 1:14; of approbation, in Psalms 2:12; of humble gratitude, in Luke 7:38; of welcome, in Exodus 18:7; of love and joy, in Genesis 20:11. There are also spiritual kisses, as in Song of Songs 1:2; sensual kisses, as in Proverbs 7:13; and hypocritical kisses, as in 2 Samuel 15:5. It was customary to kiss the mouth in biblical times, and also the beard, which is still practiced in Arab culture. Kissing the hand is not biblical, according to Tabor. The kiss of peace was an apostolic custom, and continues to be one of the rites in the Eucharistic services of Roman Catholics.

In the Roman Catholic Order of Mass, the bishop or priest celebrant bows and kisses the altar, reverencing it, upon arriving at the altar during the entrance procession before Mass and upon leaving at the recessional at the closing of Mass; if a deacon is assisting, he bows low before the altar but does not kiss it.

Among primitive cultures it was usual to throw kisses to the sun and to the moon, as well as to the images of the gods. Kissing the hand is first heard of among the Persians. According to Tabor, the kiss of homage—the character of which is not indicated in the Bible—was probably upon the forehead, and was expressive of high respect.

 In Ancient Rome and some modern Pagan beliefs, worshipers, when passing the statue or image of a god or goddess, will kiss their hand and wave it towards the deity (adoration).
 The holy kiss or kiss of peace is a traditional part of most Christian liturgies, though often replaced with an embrace or handshake today in Western cultures.
 In the gospels of Matthew and Mark (Luke and John omit this) Judas betrayed Jesus with a kiss: an instance of a kiss tainted with betrayal. This is the basis of the term "the kiss of Judas".
 Catholics will kiss rosary beads as a part of prayer, or kiss their hand after making the sign of the cross. It is also common to kiss the wounds on a crucifix, or any other image of Christ's Passion.
 Pope John Paul II would kiss the ground on arrival in a new country.
 Visitors to the Pope traditionally kiss his foot.
 Catholics traditionally kiss the ring of a cardinal or bishop.
 Catholics traditionally kiss the hand of a priest.
 Eastern Orthodox and Eastern Catholic Christians often kiss the icons around the church on entering; they will also kiss the cross and/or the priest's hand in certain other customs in the Church, such as confession or receiving a blessing.
 Local lore in Ireland suggests that kissing the Blarney Stone will bring the gift of the gab.
 Jews will kiss the Western wall of the Holy Temple in Jerusalem, and other religious articles during prayer such as the Torah, usually by touching their hand, Tallis, or Siddur (prayerbook) to the Torah and then kissing it. Jewish law prohibits kissing members of the opposite sex, except for spouses and certain close relatives. See Negiah.
 Muslims may kiss the Black Stone during Hajj (pilgrimage to Mecca). Many Muslims also kiss Shrines of Ahlulbayt and Sufis.

Biology and evolution 

Within the natural world of other animals, there are numerous analogies to kissing, notes Crawley, such as "the billing of birds, the cataglottism of pigeons and the antennal play of some insects." Even among mammals such as the dog, cat and bear, similar behavior is noted.

Anthropologists have not reached a conclusion as to whether kissing is learned or a behavior from instinct. It may be related to grooming behavior also seen between other animals, or arising as a result of mothers premasticating food for their children. Non-human primates also exhibit kissing behavior. Dogs, cats, birds and other animals display licking, nuzzling, and grooming behavior among themselves, and also towards humans or other species. This is sometimes interpreted by observers as a type of kissing.

Kissing in humans is postulated to have evolved from the direct mouth-to-mouth regurgitation of food (kiss-feeding) from parent to offspring or male to female (courtship feeding) and has been observed in numerous mammals. The similarity in the methods between kiss-feeding and deep human kisses (e.g. French kiss) are quite pronounced; in the former, the tongue is used to push food from the mouth of the mother to the child with the child receiving both the mother's food and tongue in sucking movements, and the latter is the same but forgoes the premasticated food. In fact, through observations across various species and cultures, it can be confirmed that the act of kissing and premastication has most likely evolved from the similar relationship-based feeding behaviours.

Physiology 
Kissing is a complex behavior that requires significant muscular coordination involving a total of 34 facial muscles and 112 postural muscles. The most important muscle involved is the orbicularis oris muscle, which is used to pucker the lips and informally known as the kissing muscle. In the case of the French kiss, the tongue is also an important component. Lips have many nerve endings which make them sensitive to touch and bite.

Health benefits 
Kissing stimulates the production of hormones responsible for a good mood: oxytocin, which releases the feeling of love and strengthens the bond with the partner, endorphins – hormones responsible for the feeling of happiness –, and dopamine, which stimulates the pleasure center in the brain. Regular kissing protects against depression.
Affection in general has stress-reducing effects. Kissing in particular has been studied in a controlled experiment and it was found that increasing the frequency of kissing in marital and cohabiting relationships results in a reduction of perceived stress, an increase in relationship satisfaction, and a lowering of cholesterol levels.

Disease transmission 
Kissing on the lips can result in the transmission of some diseases, including infectious mononucleosis (known as the "kissing disease") and herpes simplex when the infectious viruses are present in saliva. Research indicates that contraction of HIV via kissing is extremely unlikely, although there was a documented case in 1997 of an HIV infection by kissing. Both the woman and infected man had gum disease, so transmission was through the man's blood, not through saliva.

See also 

 Eskimo kissing
 Hand-kissing
 Hugs and kisses
 Kissing games
 Kissing traditions
 Kissing booth

References

Further reading 
 
Beadnell,C. M. (1942)  The Origin of the Kiss , Thinkers Library No.89,   Watts & Co, London

External links

Kissing in Strange Places  — slideshow by Life magazine
Put your sweet lips... (A history of the kiss), Keith Thomas, The Times, June 11, 2005
The Kiss of Life, Joshua Foer, The New York Times, February 14, 2006
Why do humans kiss each other when most animals don't?, Melissa Hogenboom, BBC Earth, July 2015
How Kissing Works, History and Anatomy of the Kiss, Tracy V. Wilson, HowStuffWorks

 
Greetings
Interpersonal relationships
Sexual acts
Gestures